"Without You" is the second single by British pop/rock band The Feeling to be released from their second studio album Join with Us . The band recorded the song in their live set each night during their tour of the UK from 7 March 2008 to 20 March 2008—these recordings became available to download at the time of the single's release. It peaked at number 53 on the UK Singles Chart.

Music video

The official music video accompanying the song shows Gillespie Sells, frontman in the group, playing a Russian cosmonaut with the rest of the band members playing other roles.

Ciaran Jeremiah describes the band's roles in the video on the band's official website. He describes himself as a "scientific-space-boffin", while "Paul is a soldier, Richard is a fellow lab-boffin, and Kev is a photographer."

Formats and track listings
CD single (Released 21 April 2008)
 "Without You" – 4:48
 "Play, Don't Think" – 4:15
 "Different for Girls" (Joe Jackson cover) – 3:29
 "I Thought It Was Over" (Tom Middleton Mix) – 7:24
 "Without You" (official music video)

7" blue vinyl (Released 21 April 2008)
 "Without You" – 4:48
 "Play Don't Think" – 4:15

Digital EP (Released 18 April 2008)
 "Without You" – 4:48
 "Play, Don't Think" – 4:15
 "Different for Girls" – 3:29
 "I Thought It Was Over" (Tom Middleton Mix) – 7:24

Digital download (Released 14 April 2008)
 "Without You" (radio edit) – 3:34

Charts

References

2008 singles
The Feeling songs
2007 songs
Island Records singles
Songs written by Dan Gillespie Sells
Songs written by Richard Jones (The Feeling)
Songs written by Kevin Jeremiah
Songs written by Ciaran Jeremiah
Songs written by Paul Stewart (musician)